Red Dart is the name of different characters appearing in comic books published by DC Comics.

A female version of Red Dart appeared on the seventh season of The CW Arrowverse show Arrow, played by actress Holly Elissa.

Fictional character biography

Jonathan Mallory

Jonathan "Midas" Mallory is a man who has been going around stopping crimes in Star City. This attracted the attention of Green Arrow and Speedy. They didn't know it yet, but Red Dart is secretly in allegiance with some gold thieves. The next night, Green Arrow deduced the truth about Red Dart where he and Speedy captured him and the gold thieves. Green Arrow proved Red Dart's allegiance to the gold thieves by removing one of Mallory's gloves to reveal gold stains which is a tell-tale sign of testing gold with Aqua-Regia.

Red Dart later plotted to assassinate Green Arrow by using a booby trap at the time he was going to speak at an engagement in Dallas, Texas. This plan fails because Atom shows up instead. He teams up with Air Wave to defeat Red Dart. When Red Dart tries to beam up to the Justice League's satellite, he is instead taken away by another teleportation beam.

Anthony
When the Justice League arrived in Belle Reve to deal with the prison riots, a minor criminal named Anthony who calls himself Red Dart steals Green Lantern's power ring during his fight with the Color Queens prison gang (consisting of Crazy Quilt, Doctor Light, Doctor Spectro, Multi-Man, and Rainbow Raider) where he plans to give it to someone on the Green Mile and then return it to Green Lantern. When Superman reclaims the power ring from Red Dart as the prison riot is being quelled, Red Dart privately remarks that this is probably the coolest thing he will ever do knowing that he will be partly responsible for the death of Superman. When Red Dart is back in his cell with nothing but a picture of Green Lantern's power ring, he wonders what his employers wanted as it is secretly revealed that his employers are Lex Luthor and Prometheus who are forming the next incarnation of the Injustice Gang. Their temporary theft of the ring somehow allowed them to sabotage it so that Green Lantern couldn't use it, but it is later revealed that this was under the influence of the universe-destroyed weapon Mageddon, with Green Lantern eventually restoring the ring to working order through force of will.

Unnamed female
In "The New 52", a reboot of the DC Comics universe, a third Red Dart appeared. This version is an unnamed female and is a member of Ricardo Diaz's Longbow Hunters alongside Brick, Count Vertigo, and Killer Moth. Red Dart is the first to attack Green Arrow who protects Henry Fyff and Naomi Sing from them. Brick and Killer Moth then assisted Red Dart in beating up Green Arrow until Oliver Queen's half-sister Emiko strikes them with a volley of trick arrows. Red Dart tries to take Emiko hostage only for Naomi to knock her in the back of her head.

Powers and abilities
The Jonathan Mallory uses trick darts.

In other media
The female incarnation of Red Dart appears in the seventh season of Arrow, portrayed by Holly Elissa. This version is a member of the Longbow Hunters who prefers quiet subterfuge and subtle tactics.

See also
Image Comics' Dart

References

External links
 Red Dart (Jonathan Mallory) at DC Wiki
 Red Dart (Anthony) at DC Wiki
 Red Dart (female version) at DC Wiki
 Red Dart at Comic Vine

1958 comics debuts
DC Comics supervillains